Stanley & Iris is a 1990 American romantic drama film directed by Martin Ritt and starring Jane Fonda and Robert De Niro. The screenplay by Harriet Frank, Jr. and Irving Ravetch is loosely based on the 1982 novel Union Street by Pat Barker.

The original music score is composed by John Williams and the cinematography is by Donald McAlpine. The film was marketed with the tagline "Some people need love spelled out for them." It was the final film for Ritt, Frank and Ravetch, as Ritt died ten months after the film's release, while Ravetch and Frank died respectively in 2010 and 2020. It was also the last film Fonda would appear in for 15 years until 2005's Monster-in-Law.

Plot
Iris King, a widow still grieving 8 months after losing her husband, lives in a high-crime area in Connecticut and works in a baking factory. She lives from paycheck to paycheck as she raises her two children, Kelly and Richard. With money already tight for the family, Kelly learns she is pregnant, making matters worse.

Iris makes the acquaintance of Stanley Cox, a cook in the bakery's canteen, when he comes to her aid after her purse is snatched on a bus. But as their friendship develops, she notices peculiarities about Stanley. Witnessing his inability to pick out a specific medication, Iris finally realizes the truth: Stanley is illiterate. When she innocently mentions this to Stanley's boss, Stanley is fired the next day over food safety and lawsuit concerns. Unable to get steady work afterwards, Stanley moves into a garage to live. He is also forced to put his elderly father (who lived with him) in a shabby retirement home, where the old man dies after only a few weeks. Broken by these events, Stanley asks Iris if she could teach him to read. He explains that his traveling-salesman father moved him between dozens of schools all over the country when Stanley was a boy, resulting in his developing no reading or writing skills from this lack of educational stability. Iris agrees and starts giving him basic reading lessons, and he gradually grows close to her and her family. During one of these reading exercises, Stanley confides in her that he has wanted to be intimate with her since they first met, but Iris is hesitant.

Iris tests Stanley's developing reading skills by making a map for him to use to meet her at a nearby street corner, but Stanley gets hopelessly lost. Later, Iris visits a discouraged Stanley at his garage residence to try to get him to resume his lessons. Stanley, who invents things as a hobby, is at work on an elaborate cake cooling machine he designed that can potentially outperform similar commercial equipment. Iris is impressed by the device and Stanley says a nearby company was also and even offered him a job. He agrees to start reading again with Iris, and in time learns to write short sentences. The two of them begin to grow close again.

Stanley and Iris finally decide to consummate their relationship, but Iris is still clinging to her late husband's memory. This threatens their budding relationship further. Unwilling to give up on Iris because she never gave up on him, Stanley finally goes to see her. Iris hands him an unmailed letter she wrote him, and Stanley surprises her by reading it aloud nearly perfectly. Iris, now ready to start letting go of the past, accompanies Stanley to a fancy hotel where they order room service and spend the night together.

Stanley soon moves to Detroit for a new, well-paying job he has been offered, his inventing ability finally having paid off. Several months later, back in Connecticut, Iris is carrying groceries home when a new car pulls up next to her, with Stanley behind the wheel. Stanley tells her he just got a raise and plans to buy a large fixer-upper house in Detroit – and that he wants the family to come live there with him, with her as his wife. Iris accepts.

Main cast

Music

Track listing

Deluxe Edition track listing

In 2017 Varèse Sarabande issued an expanded edition with John Williams' score for Martin Ritt's 1972 film Pete 'n' Tillie (tracks 27-36 - duration 17:51).

Production
The film was shot on location in Toronto, Ontario, and Waterbury, Connecticut. During the filming in Waterbury, local Vietnam War veterans picketed the production protesting Jane Fonda's anti-war activities of a decade and a half earlier. Fonda and De Niro were each paid $3.5 million for their performances. Ritt received $1.65 million and the Ravetches $500,000.

Reception
Stanley & Iris received negative reviews from critics, as the film holds a 31% rating on Rotten Tomatoes from 16 reviews. It was also a commercial failure at the box office, grossing less than $6 million against its $23 million budget.

References

External links
 
 
 
 

1990s American films
1990s English-language films
1990 films
1990 romantic drama films
American romantic drama films
Fictional married couples
Films based on British novels
Films based on romance novels
Films directed by Martin Ritt
Films scored by John Williams
Films set in Connecticut
Films shot in Connecticut
Metro-Goldwyn-Mayer films